Schools named for Richard Henry Dana, Jr. include:
 Richard Henry Dana Middle School (Arcadia), Arcadia, California
 Dana Middle School (San Diego), San Diego, California
 Richard Henry Dana Middle School (Hawthorne), Hawthorne, California
 Dana Middle School (San Pedro), San Pedro, California